Neddiel Muñoz Millalonco is a Huilliche educator, poet, researcher, and traditional singer from Chiloé Island, Chile.

Her performance of traditional indigenous music of southern South America as part of the musical group Armazón has been preserved in two recordings: Gulkantün, canto ceremonial williche, which focuses on traditional Huilliche songs and is sung in Mapudungun, and Tributo a los Selk'nam, which focuses on music of the Selk'nam people. The recordings were based on research Muñoz conducted among communities in the southern Patagonian archipelagos. Her recordings are considered a dialogue between the elders of the Huilliche people and the younger generation, with the traditional songs fused with rock styles and traditional instruments played alongside modern ones.

She also leads the band Anklaje, which performs indigenous music that, Muñoz says, "was forgotten for many years, but is reclaiming its place and the respect that it always should have been given." She has worked to further spread knowledge of this music through presenting at international festivals and collaborating on preservation projects with the General Council of Caciques of Chiloé. In 2020, her piece "Kitral" won her second place in the folk music category of the Concurso de Composición Musical Luis Advis, a composition contest in Chile.

Muñoz has also written poetry and worked as a children's educator and as an actress, appearing in the Silvio Caiozzi film And Suddenly the Dawn in 2017.

Discography 

 Gülkantun - Canto Ceremonial Williche (1999), with Armazón
 El deshielo del canto - Tributo a los Selk'nam (2003), with Armazón
 Encaminados por los espíritus (2017), with Anklaje
 We Newen (2019), with Anklaje

Filmography 

 La primera música (2012)
 ...Y de pronto el amanecer (2018)

References 

Living people
20th-century births
20th-century Chilean women singers
20th-century Chilean poets
21st-century Chilean poets
Chilean women poets
People from Chiloé Province
Huilliche people
21st-century Chilean women singers
21st-century Chilean actresses
Year of birth missing (living people)
Mapuche poets
Mapuche singers
Mapuche women